Ustynivka is a village in Sievierodonetsk Raion (district) in Luhansk Oblast of eastern Ukraine, at about  NW from the centre of Luhansk city and at about  SSE from the centre of Sievierodonetsk city, on the right bank of the Siverskyi Donets river.

The village came under attack of Russian forces during the Russian invasion of Ukraine in 2022. Two villagers were killed on 25 May.

References

Villages in Sievierodonetsk Raion